The Southern California Review of Law and Social Justice is an honors journal of legal scholarship that examines issues at the intersection of social justice and the law published by an independent student group at the USC Gould School of Law.

Introduction
The Southern California Review of Law and Social Justice (RLSJ) promotes the discussion and examination of issues lying at the intersection of social justice and the law. RLSJ publishes legal narratives and analyses of case law and legislation that address the law's interaction with historically underrepresented groups and highlight the law's potential as an instrument of positive social change. These narratives and analyses borrow from the perspectives of a wide range of disciplines. The goal of RLSJ is to influence the development of the law in ways that encourage full and equal participation of all people in politics and society.

Notes and references

American law journals
Triannual journals